This timeline of the Portolá expedition tracks the progress during 1769 and 1770 of the first European exploration-by-land of north-western coastal areas in what became Las Californias, a province of Spanish colonial New Spain. Later, the region was administratively-split into Baja (lower, see Baja California peninsula) and Alta (upper, see Alta California). The first section of the march was on the Baja California peninsula, and the northern section of the expedition's trail was in today's US state of California.

Missionary Juan Crespi kept a diary describing the group's daily progress and detailed descriptions of their locations, allowing modern researchers to reconstruct their journey. Portions of other diaries by Gaspar de Portolá, engineer Miguel Costansó, missionary Junípero Serra, army officer Jose de Canizares, and Sergeant José Ortega also survived. When analyzed as a whole, they provide detailed daily information on the route traveled and camping locations, as well as descriptions of the country and its native inhabitants.

Background
The Portolá expedition was the brainchild of José de Gálvez, visitador (inspector general, a personal representative of the king) in New Spain. On his recommendation, King Charles III of Spain authorized Gálvez to explore Alta California and establish the first permanent Spanish presence there.  Gálvez was supported in the planning of an expedition by Carlos Francisco de Croix (Viceroy of New Spain), and Father Junípero Serra (head of the Franciscan mission to the Californias).

Gálvez and Serra met in November, 1768, to plan the expedition. The goals set were to establish two Presidios and nearby missions – at San Diego and Monterrey (one "r" has since been dropped). These places had been described and given names 166 years before by the maritime explorations of Sebastián Vizcaíno. In addition, the name San Carlos Borromeo was chosen for the mission at Monterrey.

Gálvez placed Gaspar de Portolá, recently appointed governor of Las Californias, in overall command of the expedition. Second in command was Captain Fernando Rivera y Moncada, commander of the Presidio at Loreto. Serra headed the Franciscan missionary contingent. Three ships were also assigned: two to follow the land march up the coast and keep the expedition supplied from the naval depot at La Paz (on the Baja peninsula), and another ship to connect La Paz with the mainland at San Blas.

Elements of the land expedition gathered north of Loreto in March, 1769, and marched north-west to San Diego; then from San Diego to the San Francisco Peninsula and back. Rivera led the first group, consisting mainly of soldiers, scouts and engineers to prepare the road and deal with hostile natives. Portolá and Serra followed in a second group with the civilians, livestock and baggage. Serra stayed with the new mission in San Diego while Portolá and Rivera took a smaller group north.

Led by Rivera's scouts, the road followed established native paths as much as possible (the southern and central California coastal areas were found to have the densest native population of any region north of central Mexico), and blazing new trails where necessary. The two main requirements for a camping place were an adequate supply of drinkable fresh water and forage for the livestock. For that reason, most of the campsites were near creeks, ponds or springs. All three of the main land expedition diaries give daily distances traveled in leagues. As used at that time, one Spanish league equaled about 2.6 miles. A typical day's march covered 2–4 leagues, with frequent rest days.

The following year (1770), Portolá returned north as far as Monterrey to establish the second Presidio there and to establish a new provincial seat. Serra came north by sea to make the Mission San Carlos Borromeo del rio Carmelo (moved a few miles south from its original Monterrey location) his headquarters. Portolá's successor as governor, Pedro Fages, found an easier inland route later in 1770 from Monterrey to San Francisco Bay, and further explored the eastern side of the bay in 1772 (accompanied again by padre Juan Crespí, who again kept a diary).

The 1776 expedition of Juan Bautista de Anza used the official Portolá expedition report (drawn from the diaries) to follow mostly in the footsteps of Portolá from Mission San Gabriel to Monterrey, taking the Fages route from Monterrey to San Francisco Bay. Much of today's Juan Bautista de Anza National Historic Trail in coastal California was previously the Portolá trail. Sixteen of the twenty-one Spanish Missions of California were established along the Portolá route.

About the diaries
The Crespí diary is the most complete of the three land expedition accounts, because Crespí was the only diarist present during the entire expedition. It includes nearly all of the information found in the other two, plus many extra details about the country and the native peoples. Herbert Bolton translated Crespi's diary to English and annotated it with modern references. Bolton added information about the modern campsite locations, as shown below. Bolton also included maps with his "best guess" of the expedition's march routes, superimposed on modern California maps.

In 2001, a new edition of the Crespí diary was published, with side-by-side Spanish and English text – both of Crespí's original field notes, and also his expanded rewrite for the later official version.

Vicente Vila, captain of the San Carlos — one of three ships supporting the expedition — also kept a diary that has survived, but he only sailed as far as San Diego, and never joined the expedition on land. Free online translations of both Vila's and Costansó's diaries are available. Fages also wrote, in 1775, an after-the fact account of the 1769–70 expedition.

The official report of the expedition is also available online. Written later by Carlos Francisco de Croix, marqués de Croix, the brief document drew on the diaries kept by the expedition participants.

January to June in Baja California

Month by month in Alta California

References

External links
 "Three Portolá Expedition Diaries". The Pacifica Historical Society website includes a very useful formatting of the three most complete diaries side-by-side for each day of the expedition from July 14 on.

Portola expedition timeline
Portola expedition timeline
Portola expedition timeline
Portola
Portola expedition